Ralph Sonnenberg is a Dutch billionaire, and former CEO of the Netherlands-based Hunter Douglas Group.

Biography

Ralph Sonnenberg was born in May 1934.

Hunter Douglas was founded by his father, who was Jewish and fled Germany in the early 1930s, in 1919. He owned at least 80% of Hunter Douglas.

Sonnenberg is married with three children, and lives in Meggen, Switzerland. His sons David and Marko work for the company, both holding the role of Executive Chairman and Senior Advisor, respectively.

References

1934 births
Living people
Dutch billionaires
Dutch businesspeople
Dutch expatriates in Switzerland
People from Lucerne-Land District
Dutch people of Jewish descent